Tanacross (Taats’altęy in Tanacross Athabascan) is a census-designated place (CDP) in Southeast Fairbanks Census Area, Alaska, United States. At the 2010 census the population was 136, down from 140 in 2000. It hosts an air tanker base.

History 
Tanacross, initially founded as a telegraph station called Tanana Crossing (also known as St. Timothy's). The name was shortened to Tanacross before 1940. The village was initially located on the north bank of the Tanana River. An airstrip was built on the south bank during the mid-1930s and upgraded for military use during World War II in 1941–42. Thousands of troops deployed through Tanacross during the period. The airfield was closed after the war. In 1972, the town itself relocated south across the river due to water contamination. In 1979, the old village burned due to an uncontrolled grass fire.

Geography
Tanacross is located at  (63.376206, -143.356991).

Climate
Tanacross has a dry-winter continental subarctic climate (Köppen Dwc).

Demographics

Tanacross first appeared on the 1920 U.S. Census as the unincorporated village of "Tanana Crossing." In 1940, the name was combined to form "Tanacross." It was made a census-designated place (CDP) in 1980.

As of the census of 2000, there were 140 people, 42 households, and 28 families residing in the CDP. The population density was 1.7 people per square mile (0.7/km2). There were 53 housing units at an average density of 0.7/sq mi (0.3/km2). The racial makeup of the CDP was 8.57% White, 88.57% Native American, 1.43% from other races, and 1.43% from two or more races. 1.43% of the population were Hispanic or Latino of any race.

Of the 42 households, 33.3% had children under the age of 18 living with them, 40.5% were married couples living together, 11.9% had a female householder with no husband present, and 31.0% were non-families. 28.6% of all households were made up of individuals, and none had someone living alone who was 65 years of age or older. The average household size was 3.33 and the average family size was 3.93.

In the CDP, the age distribution of the population shows 30.7% under the age of 18, 10.7% from 18 to 24, 25.0% from 25 to 44, 27.1% from 45 to 64, and 6.4% who were 65 years of age or older. The median age was 33 years. For every 100 females, there were 112.1 males. For every 100 females age 18 and over, there were 110.9 males.

The median income for a household in the CDP was $22,083, and the median income for a family was $31,250. Males had a median income of $71,250 versus $24,583 for females. The per capita income for the CDP was $9,429. There were 22.6% of families and 33.3% of the population living below the poverty line, including 43.6% of under eighteens and none of those over 64.

Education
Tanacross is part of the Alaska Gateway School District. Tanacross School, a K-8 campus, and serves community students.

References

Tanana Athabaskans
Census-designated places in Alaska
Census-designated places in Southeast Fairbanks Census Area, Alaska
Census-designated places in Unorganized Borough, Alaska